Ranunculus penicillatus is a species of flowering plant belonging to the family Ranunculaceae.

Its native range is Europe, Morocco.

Synonyms:
  Batrachium penicillatum Dumort.
 Ranunculus cambricus A.Benn. ex Druce

References

Ranunculaceae
penicillatus